Swamp banksia is a common name for several plants and may refer to:

Banksia littoralis, endemic to Western Australia
Banksia paludosa, native to New South Wales
Banksia robur, native to New South Wales

Banksia taxa by common name